Bilha may refer to:

 Bilha, India, a town in Chhattisgarh
 Bilhah, Rachel's handmaid in the Book of Genesis